Jeet is a Hindi term meaning  "victory" or "win". It may refer to:

 Jeet (1949 film), a Hindi film  starring Dev Anand and Durga Khote
 Jeet (1972 film), a Hindi film by Adurthi Subba Rao
 Jeet (1996 film), a Hindi film by Raj Kanwar
 Jeet (TV series), Indian television series which aired on Star Plus
 Jeet (actor) (born 1978), Indian actor
 Jeet Gannguli (fl. 2000s), Indian music composer and singer